IVCF may stand for:

 InterVarsity Christian Fellowship
 Inter-Varsity Christian Fellowship of Canada
 InterVarsity Choral Festival (Canada)
 Sydney Intervarsity Choral Festival, (also SIV)